A list of films produced in Italy in 2004 (see 2004 in film):

See also
2004 in Italian television

External links
Italian films of 2004 at the Internet Movie Database

2004
Films
Italian